Pájaro loco is a 1971 Argentine comedy film directed by Lucas Demare. It stars Luis Sandrini, María José Demare, Víctor Laplace and José Cibrián.

References

External links
 

1971 films
1970s Spanish-language films
1971 comedy films
Argentine comedy films
Films directed by Lucas Demare
1970s Argentine films